Zafeiris Melas or Zafiris Melas (Greek: Ζαφείρης Μελάς) is a Greek contemporary pop-folk laïko singer.

He was born in Xanthi to Muslim Romani parents and grew up in a poor neighbourhood. In his youth, he started performing in local groups of folkloric songs until he was noticed by the owners of the Cosmos recording company Antonis Stamboulis and Poly Vairemidi.

During his career, Melas made partnerships with many other famous Greek singers. including Manolis Angelopoulos, Vasilis Karras and Popi Maliotaki.

Melas lives in Greece with his wife Constantina, with whom he has three kids, Thodoris, Anna and Poly. He once expressed that his greatest secret that keeps him young are his two grandchildren, Zafeiris and Constantina.

Discography
1983 – Ας Αλλάξουμε Το Θέμα
1985 – Αναποφάσιστος
1987 – Περιμένοντας
1988 – Βασίλης Καρράς, Ζαφείρης Μελάς, Μάκης Καλατζής – Μια Βραδιά Στη Θεσσαλονίκη
1989 – Τα Φωτοστέφανα
1990 – Αφιέρωμα Στον Μανώλη
1991 – Ο Ίδιος Άνθρωπος
1992 – Μια Βραδιά Στη Σαλονίκη (Ζωντανή Ηχογράφηση)
1992 – Ο Καιρός Του Ζαφείρη
1993 – Βγες Απ' Το Μυαλό μου
1994 – Τα Παράπονά Μου
1996 – Θέλω Να Ζήσω
1997 – Βρέχει στη Θεσσαλονίκη
1998 – Επειγόντως
2000 – Όσο Περνάει Ο Καιρός
2001 – Melas Live
2002 – Best – Όλες Οι Επιτυχίες
2003 – Ζωή Παραμυθένια
2004 – Live Στην Θεσσαλονίκη
2005 – Ιδιωτική Εγγραφή
2005 – Μπαλάντες & Ζειμπέκικα
2005 – Ό,τι Καλύτερο Μες Τη Ζωή Μου
2006 – Τραγούδια Από Ζαφείρι – Ζαφείρης Μελάς Live
2007 – Live Οι Μεγάλες Επιτυχίες
2007 – Χίλια Αστέρια
2008 – Χρυσή Δισκοθήκη
2008 – Δημοτικά Τραγούδια Απ´ Όλη Την Ελλάδα
2009 – Μια Φωνή
2009 – Μελάς & Χριστοδουλόπουλος LIVE
2011 – Ο Τρελός Μου Χαρακτήρας
2013 – Στην Υγεία Σου
2016 – Γλέντι Με Τον Ζαφείρη Μελά

Single
2014 – Αγάπη Λάθος
2014 – Φίλοι (ντουέτα Τόνι Στοράρο)
2015 – Δεν Κάνω Πίσω
2016 – Χωρίς Εσένα
2016 – Ακόμα Σ' Αγαπάω
2017 – Επίλογος
2017 – Άϊντε Να Τελειώνουμε
2018 – Όνειρο Αν Είσαι
2018 – Χωρισμός
2019 – Στα Βαλκάνια
2020 – Γύρνα Χειμωνιάζει
2020 – Χαράματα

References

Living people
People from Xanthi
Greek laïko singers
21st-century Greek male singers
20th-century Greek male singers
1952 births